Pedro Henrique Botelho (born 4 April 1987) is a Brazilian former football player.

Club career
He played in one Russian Premier League match for PFC Krylia Sovetov Samara during the 2007 season.

References

1987 births
Sportspeople from Minas Gerais
Living people
Brazilian footballers
Association football defenders
CR Flamengo footballers
FK Vėtra players
PFC Krylia Sovetov Samara players
FK Sūduva Marijampolė players
A Lyga players
Russian Premier League players
Brazilian expatriate footballers
Expatriate footballers in Lithuania
Brazilian expatriate sportspeople in Lithuania
Expatriate footballers in Russia
Brazilian expatriate sportspeople in Russia